The Polish Baseball and Softball Federation (Polski Związek Baseballu i Softballu), is the governing body of baseball and softball in Poland. It is a member of the International Baseball Federation. The Polish Baseball and Softball Federation was established in 1978. There is no clear information when baseball was first introduced in Poland, but it used to be said that in 50s- 60s mostly in Silesia Region thanks to the contacts with Czechoslovakian players, but then it was developed in 80s also in other regions of Poland and the official league started in 1984.

External links
Polski Zwiazek Baseballu i Softballu
Page on baseballeurope.com
 Did Baseball Come to the US from Poland?

Softball organizations
Baseball
Baseball governing bodies in Europe
Baseball in Poland
Softball in Poland